James Walker Russell (14 September 1916 – 17 August 1994) was a Scottish professional footballer who played as an inside forward for Sunderland.

References

1916 births
1994 deaths
Footballers from Edinburgh
Scottish footballers
Association football inside forwards
Sunderland A.F.C. players
Norwich City F.C. players
Crystal Palace F.C. players
New Brighton A.F.C. players
Fleetwood Town F.C. players
English Football League players